"Feeling of Falling" is a single by American DJ group Cheat Codes and German singer Kim Petras, released on November 30, 2018. The track was written by Ivy Adara, Trevor Dahl, Matthew Elifritz, Aaron Jennings, Sean Myer, and Kevin Pederson.

Background and composition
Unlike her previous records, Petras did not co-write "Feeling of Falling". While reflecting on the record, Petras stated “I’m the biggest emo so I really connected to the song! Cheat Codes are amazing and I’ve had the best time collaborating on this one."

According to Kim June 4, 2019 on Twitter, the music video was scrapped.

Track listing

Charts

References

2018 singles
2018 songs
Cheat Codes (DJs) songs
Kim Petras songs
Songs written by Ivy Adara